Kole Weathers is a fictional superheroine in DC Comics. She is a former member of the Teen Titans.

Fictional character biography
Professor Abel Weathers, paranoid of an impending nuclear holocaust, was attempting to find a way for humanity to survive the fallout through forced evolution. One of the test subjects in his experiments was his 16-year-old daughter, Kole, whom he grafted with crystal and Promethium (a fictionalized version of the real-world element promethium). Instead of evolving to survive a nuclear fallout as her father intended, Kole found herself with the ability to create and control pure silicon crystal at will.

Kole was then kidnapped by the mad sun Titaness, Thia. For two years, Thia forced Kole to use her powers to construct a crystal prison in which Thia could hold important prisoners. Thia eventually came into conflict with the Teen Titans, which ultimately led to the death of the goddess and Kole winning her freedom. Lilith, a member of the Titans with limited precognition, sensed the "dark clouds of destruction" around Kole and warned her that she would face a "grim future" should she return to Earth and invited her to remain in Olympus. Kole declined, electing to reclaim her life on Earth. Now back on Earth, Kole tried to reunite with her parents, only to find that her father's experiments had produced a house full of crystalline and insectoid monstrosities. When the Titans came to confront him, he had them captured and attempted to subject them to the same experiments. Kole helped them to escape and in the ensuing conflict, the lab self-destructed. Abel, his wife Marilyn, and the rest of their test subjects emerged from the wreckage, transformed into insect forms which would allow them to survive a nuclear holocaust. Having nowhere else to go, Kole chose to go with the Titans to New York City. Though she never "officially" joined the group she was certainly considered a Titan by some members (evidenced later in stories such as The Secret Origins of the Teen Titans in which Dick Grayson laments how Kole was a "Titan for such a short time").

Lacking a home of her own, Kole lived with Adeline and Joseph Wilson. As a result of this Kole developed an immediate friendship with Jericho. She was deeply upset when Jericho along with a few other Titans went on a mission to deep space, yet could not accompany Jericho with whom she had fallen in love. Shortly after this, in the pages of Crisis on Infinite Earths, Kole attempted to save the Earth-2 Robin and Earth-2 Huntress from the Anti-Monitor's shadow-demons. She failed, and all three were apparently killed, their bodies never found.

In Grant Morrison's Animal Man storyline "Deus Ex Machina", Psycho-Pirate, while in Arkham Asylum, recreated characters removed from continuity. Kole (or a Pre-Crisis version of her) was one of them. Kole appears as she originally did. Presumably, this character vanished from existence when the Psycho-Pirate's episode of madness ended, along with her colleagues.

She appeared in Team Titans #8-12, the implication at the time being that she was a ghost of some sort. Later on, in #24, after a year of not appearing, she was shown in Monarch's lair, implying she was one of his puppets and has been removed from continuity.

Years later during the Infinite Crisis event, Kole was briefly resurrected and placed under the control of Brother Blood, who forced her to battle the newest incarnation of Teen Titans. She was defeated and returned to the grave along with the other undead Titans.

Kole would briefly resurface one year later when Kid Eternity summoned her from the afterlife to help locate the soul of Kid Devil's Aunt Marla. After Kid Devil tells Kole that he had read about her in the Titans archives and thinks she is cool, she expresses gratitude and says she wishes that he could have been a member of the team while she was still alive. She then returns to her resting place, leaving the two heroes to continue on their own.

Powers and abilities
Kole has the power to "spin" crystal, which is to create silicon crystal into independent masses—anything from a crystal "sculpture to a safety slide". She is known to encase people in crystal, effectively immobilizing them. It is not clear what happens to the crystal she spins; whether it eventually breaks down or remains in existence has never been established (she once spun a crystal bridge to transport herself and Jericho from Manhattan to Titans Tower in the East River; what happened to that bridge is subject to debate).

Kole also has the ability to fly, but it is unclear whether this also comes from the experiments that gave her powers, or granted to her during her tenure as Thia's slave. Later in the Teen Titans comics, Kole is seen transporting herself on a crystal carpet. Only once has Kole been seen moving through crystal (or at least the crystal she spun herself).

Alternate versions

Earth One 
In Teen Titans: Earth One, Kole is one of the children given powers from the Titans Project headed by Niles Caulder. Alongside Wally West and Cassie Sandsmark, she is one of the first Titans to work for Caulder, even considering him a father. After a struggle with the other experimented children, Vic Stone, Tara Markov, Gar Logan, Tempest, Raven, a repenting Deathstroke and the alien Starfire, Kole turns on Caulder. In this version she is Asian and it is heavily implied she begins dating Gar at the end of volume 2.

Convergence 
Kole appears as a Teen Titan in Convergence. Her team fights the Tangent Universe Doom Patrol. In the end, the teams decide to work together and the Teen Titans are returned to their own universe.

In other media

 A teenage Kole appears in Teen Titans, voiced by Tara Strong. This version can transform her entire body into durable crystal, which enables her to absorb and reflect energy, as well as be wielded as a weapon by her partner Gnarrk, whom she lives with in a large Arctic cavern populated with prehistoric creatures. After becoming honorary Teen Titans, Kole and Gnarrk go on to help them defeat the Brotherhood of Evil.
 The Teen Titans animated series incarnation of Kole appears in Teen Titans Go! issue #32.

References

Comics characters introduced in 1985
DC Comics female superheroes
DC Comics metahumans
DC Comics superheroes
Characters created by George Pérez
Characters created by Marv Wolfman